Willie Dunn Sr. (19 August 1821 – 14 February 1878) was a Scottish professional golfer who played during the mid-to-late 19th century. He was born in Musselburgh, Scotland, in 1821 and died there. Dunn had three top-10 finishes in the Open Championship, with his best result being seventh in the 1861 Open Championship.

Early life
Willie Dunn was born in Musselburgh, Scotland, on 19 August 1821. Along with his twin brother, Jamie, he played in many challenge matches between 1840–60. Dunn apprenticed under the Gourlay family and was keeper of the greens at Blackheath until 1864 when he returned to the Thistle Golf Club at Leith Links.

Golf career

The 1861 Open Championship
Dunn placed seventh in the 1861 Open Championship, carding consistent rounds of 61-59-60=180.

The 1861 Open Championship was a golf competition held at Prestwick Golf Club, Ayrshire, Scotland. It was the second Open Championship and the first to open to amateurs as well as professionals. Ten professionals and eight amateurs contested the event, with Tom Morris Sr. winning the championship by 4 shots from Willie Park Sr.

Family
Dunn had two sons, Thomas Dunn and Willie Dunn Jr.

Death
Dunn died in Musselburgh, Scotland, of epithelioma of lip—a form of skin cancer—in 1878.

Results in major championships

Note: Dunn played only in the Open Championship.

DNP = Did not play
NT = No tournament
F? = Competed, finish unknown
"T" indicates a tie for a place
Yellow background for top-10

References

Scottish male golfers
Golfers from Musselburgh
1821 births
1878 deaths